Li Zhesi ( or Liz Li; born 7 August 1995 in Shenyang, Liaoning) is a female Chinese swimmer, who competed for Team China at the 2008 Summer Olympics.

In June 2012, the Chinese Anti-Doping Agency announced Li tested positive for the performance-enhancing drug erythropoietin (EPO). She was dropped from the Olympic team.

Major achievements 
2007 National Intercity Games – 1st; 50m free
2007 National Winter Championships – 1st; 50m free
2009 FINA World Championships – 1st (World Record); 4 × 100 m medley relay

References

External links
http://2008teamchina.olympic.cn/index.php/personview/personsen/5359

1995 births
Living people
Swimmers from Shenyang
Chinese female freestyle swimmers
Olympic swimmers of China
Swimmers at the 2008 Summer Olympics
World record setters in swimming
World Aquatics Championships medalists in swimming
Chinese sportspeople in doping cases
Doping cases in swimming
Medalists at the 2010 Asian Games
Asian Games gold medalists for China
Asian Games silver medalists for China
Asian Games medalists in swimming
Swimmers at the 2010 Asian Games
Medalists at the FINA World Swimming Championships (25 m)
21st-century Chinese women